Tour Triangle, also known as Projet Triangle, or simply Triangle, is a skyscraper to be built in the exhibition site Parc des Expositions de la Porte de Versailles in Paris, France. It will be the first skyscraper built in the city of Paris since Tour Montparnasse in 1973. In 2021, the construction contract was awarded to BESIX Group.

Description

The Swiss architecture practice Herzog & De Meuron, which had previously designed the  'Bird's Nest' Olympic stadium in Beijing, was chosen to design the project.

In April 2011, VIPARIS, the project owner, was given the green light for Triangle. The tower site is located next to Porte de Versailles in the “Parc des Expositions” (southwest of Paris).

The plans for the construction of the tower were initially rejected by Paris City councillors on 17 November 2014. A second ballot on the matter by the Paris City Council on 30 June 2015 approved the building. Critics of the Tour Triangle had opposed the project because of its controversial height. The 42-story project is to be the first skyscraper to be built in low-rise Paris in approximately 40 years since the construction of the Tour Montparnasse.

Architecture
Being 42 floors high, it would accommodate about 5,000 employees and host offices, street-level shops, panoramic observatories and a panoramic restaurant on the top floor.

Sustainability and environmental quality
Tour Triangle is to be a sustainable skyscraper: It was designed to achieve a high energy performance and reach the HQE and BREEAM certifications. It would favor natural light, and generate one-fourth the CO2 of a standard building of its size.

References

External links
Images of first Paris skyscraper leaked
Paris Triangle: beyond the shadows of doubt

Buildings and structures under construction in France
Skyscrapers in Paris
Pyramids in France
Herzog & de Meuron buildings
Buildings and structures in the 15th arrondissement of Paris
Skyscraper office buildings in France